Arakeri is a panchayat village in the southern state of Karnataka, India. Administratively, Arakeri is under Bilagi Taluka of Bagalkot District in Karnataka.  Arakeri is 4.5 km by road north of Katarki and 25 km by road west southwest of the town of Bilagi.

Demographics 
 census, the village of Arakeri had an estimated population of 4,611.

Notes

External links
 

Villages in Bagalkot district